Eleuterio Anguita Hinojosa (born 31 March 1969 in Madrid) is a former Spanish cyclist. He rode in 10 editions of the Vuelta a España and 2 editions of the Giro d'Italia.

Palmares

1991
1st Stage 4 Troféu Joaquim Agostinho
1993
1st Stage 4 Vuelta a Galicia
1995
1st Stage 7 Volta ao Alentejo
1997
1st Stage 4 Vuelta a España
1998
1st Stage 2 Vuelta a Burgos
2nd Clásica a los Puertos de Guadarrama
2001
2nd Clásica de Sabiñánigo
9th Clásica de Almería

References

1969 births
Living people
Spanish male cyclists
Cyclists from Madrid